The Delaware State Hornets women's basketball team is the basketball team that represents Delaware State University in Dover, Delaware, United States. The school's team currently competes in the Mid-Eastern Athletic Conference.

History
Delaware State began play in 1976. They have won one regular season title (2004) and one tournament title (2007). In their first NCAA tournament, they lost to Vanderbilt 62–47 in the First Round.

In the 2021–22 season, the team went winless for the first time in program history, finishing with an 0–24 overall record.

NCAA tournament results

References

External links